Adrian Wright (1 July 1947 – 28 November 2015) was English Australian actor remembered for his roles in the 1970s children's television series Freewheelers and the Australian serial Prisoner in which he played male nurse Neil Murray, after playing an off-duty policeman in episode 10.

Personal life and career
Born in Maidenhead, England, he was the son of Matvin Wright, a painter and first appeared as an actor in repertory theatres in England and Wales. He subsequently moved to Australia where he continued his career. His most prominent role is probably that of Neil Murray in Prisoner. He was married to Australian actress and singer Abigail, he died in 2015.

Selected filmography
 Freewheelers (1972)
 Village Hall (1974)
 End Play (1975)
 Summerfield (1977)
 The Survivor (1981)
 Sky Pirates (1986)
 The Lighthorsemen (1987)
 Gross Misconduct (1993)
 Body Melt (1993)
 Halifax f.p. (1995) - episode 2

References

External links

 

1947 births
2015 deaths
Australian male television actors
English emigrants to Australia
English male television actors
Logie Award winners
People from Maidenhead